Thomas Wilson Bradley (April 6, 1844 – May 30, 1920) was a United States Representative from New York and a recipient of the United States military's highest decoration, the Medal of Honor.

Biography
Born in Yorkshire, England, Bradley immigrated to the United States in 1846 with his parents, who settled in Walden, New York. He attended school until nine years of age, and then began working for his family's business, the New York Knife Company, as a "shop boy."

Bradley enlisted in the Army from Walden in August 1862, advanced to become a sergeant, and later received a commission.  After the Battle of Chancellorsville, he was promoted to captain and became the aide-de-camp to Major General Gershom Mott, 3rd Division, II Corps. He later received a brevet promotion to major of Volunteers.  Bradley was wounded at the Battle of Gettysburg, the Battle of the Wilderness, and the Battle of Boydton Plank Road, and was mustered out with his regiment in June 1865.  After the war Bradley was active in the Military Order of the Loyal Legion of the United States and other veterans organizations and reunion societies.  Bradley also continued his military service as assistant inspector general of the New York National Guard with the rank of lieutenant colonel, later receiving promotion to colonel.

Bradley was a member of the New York State Assembly (Orange Co., 1st D.) in 1876; and a delegate to the 1892, 1896 and 1900 Republican National Conventions.

Bradley was elected as a Republican to the 58th, 59th, 60th, 61st and 62nd United States Congress, holding office from March 4, 1903, to March 4, 1913.

Bradley was a member of the board of directors, vice president and president of the Walden National Bank.  He was also a member of the board of directors of the Columbus Trust Company and the Walden Savings Bank.  Bradley was employed by the New York Knife Company for more than 50 years, and rose through the company's ranks to become president and treasurer.

Bradley died in Walden, New York, at age 76 and was interred there in Wallkill Valley Cemetery.

Medal of Honor citation
He received the Medal of Honor for actions on May 3, 1863 at the Battle of Chancellorsville.

Rank and organization: Sergeant, Company H, 124th New York Volunteer Infantry Regiment. Place and date: At Chancellorsville, Va., May 3, 1863. Entered service at: Walden, N.Y. Born: April 6, 1844, England. Date of issue: June 10, 1896.

Citation:
Volunteered in response to a call and alone, in the face of a heavy fire of musketry and canister, went and procured ammunition for the use of his comrades.

See also

List of American Civil War Medal of Honor recipients: A–F

Notes

References

 Retrieved on 2007-11-07

External links

1844 births
1920 deaths
United States Army Medal of Honor recipients
English emigrants to the United States
English-born Medal of Honor recipients
People from Walden, New York
Union Army officers
Republican Party members of the New York State Assembly
American Civil War recipients of the Medal of Honor
Republican Party members of the United States House of Representatives from New York (state)